Stag Radio is the radio station run by the students of the University of Surrey in Guildford, Surrey, England,  which broadcasts on 1350AM during term-time. It is a long term Restricted Service Licensed broadcaster operating under a Low-power AM licence.

History
The radio station started out as University Radio Surrey in 1972, before being rebranded as Guildford Campus Radio (GCR) in 1990. In 2001 the radio station was renamed GU2 after the postcode prefix of the area surrounding the University campus. Following the rebranding GU2 won the title of "Best Station" at the 2002 SRA Awards reflecting the pursuit of an innovative format featuring favourites such as The J-Team, Ben Lander, Gareth Davies, Pinal Gandhi ("P") with The Vibe and a fair smattering of Greek language and religious content overnight.  GU2 also won the award for "Best Interview" at the 2010 SRA awards. James Alexander won the award for his interview with Sue Doughty, member of the Liberal Democrats and most recently Adam Read and Olivia Jones took Silver in Student Radio Chart Show 2013.

In 2004 the radio station was visited by the Prince Edward, Earl of Wessex as part of his trip to the University. Also in that year GU2, along with many other UK student radio stations, faced a crisis when the Student Broadcast Network (SBN) closed down. SBN had not only been providing the station with a source of income, but also providing news and music programmes to fill gaps in the schedule.

Other notable visitors include Cliff Richard who was interviewed by the station.
In more recent times, members have conducted interviews with We Are Scientists, Wheatus, Alter Bridge, Glasvegas, The Twang, The Commitments, Venga Boys, Dan Le Sac Vs. Scroobius Pip, Empire of the Sun, Ivyrise, Anberlin, Faithless and White Lies.

In 2010, the station featured in national newspaper, The Guardian, in an article by Lucy Tobin, about the importance of extra-curricular activities to give employability.

In 2013, the station was re-branded to Stag Radio; the most recent and current radio name that has been taken on by Surrey Student Union.

Organisation
Stag Radio is a society and is run by a committee elected at annual general meetings held at the university. All students of the university are eligible to stand and vote in these elections. Stag Radio society has a constitution based on that of its parent body- the University of Surrey Students' Union.

The current committee structure has three signatories: Station Manager, Vice President, and Treasurer. Underneath these positions are the various Heads of vital aspects in the running of Stag Radio. 

As of October 2022, the current committee is filled in the following positions:

References

University of Surrey
Student radio in the United Kingdom
Radio stations established in 1972